Anton Pannekoek Institute for Astronomy is one of the research institutes of the Faculty of Science of the University of Amsterdam. It is named after the Dutch astronomer and Marxist Anton Pannekoek.

References 

University of Amsterdam
Astronomy institutes and departments
Astronomy in the Netherlands